= October 2026 Khartoum shooting =

Shooting against Egyptians

October 2026 Khartoum Shooting
- Part of the aftermath of the E.A.F airstrikes on Sudanese gold mines
- Location: Khartoum, Sudan
- Date: 12 Oct 2026
- Target: Egyptian truck workers
- Deaths: 2
- Injuries: 1
- Perpetrator: Ibrahim Ali Abdullah Adam
- Motive: Retaliation for Egyptian airstrikes on gold mines in Sudan

On 12 October 2026, a man identified as Ibrahim Ali Abdullah Adam fatally killed 2 Egyptian truck workers and injured 1 other in the capital Khartoum.

== Attack ==
On 12 October 2026, 3 Egyptian truck drivers were shot. Two of the targets passed away. The perpetrator, Ibrahim Ali Abdullah Adam was arrested and confessed his motive was to get revenge for his brother who was killed after the Egyptian Air Force violently killed over 200 people in an airstrike on gold mines.

== Reactions ==
Egypt: The Foreign Minister Badr Adelatty had a telephone call with his Sudanese counterpart Mohieddin Salem, to discuss bilateral relations and regional developments. The two reaffirmed the historical ties between the two nations. Abdelatty instructed the Egyptian ambassador to contact Sudanese authorities to establish the circumstances of in the incident and to check on the injured Egyptian who survived.

== Aftermath ==
On 13 October, the survivor, Ahmed Ali, had a successful surgery and is waiting for medical clearance for him to return to Egypt, quoted by the Foreign Ministry spokesman in Egypt, Nadir Zaki.
